The United States has political, economic and cultural ties with the independent African countries.

Pre-1940
Before World War II, the United States dealt directly only with the former American colony of Liberia, the independent nation of Ethiopia, the independent nation of Morocco, and the semi-independent nation of Egypt.

Liberia

U.S. relations with Liberia date back to 1819, when the Congress appropriated $100,000 for the establishment of Liberia.  The settlers were free blacks or freed slaves who were selected and funded by the American Colonization Society (ACS).  The religious ethos and cultural norms of the ACS shaped Afro-American settler society and determined social behavior in 19th-century Liberia. The Methodist Episcopal Church sent black ministers as missionaries to Liberia. Although they could identify with the local population on a purely racial basis, the nature of their religious indoctrination caused them to view the Liberians as inferiors whose souls needed saving.

Under Republican President Abraham Lincoln, The United States officially recognized Liberia in 1862, 15 years after its establishment as a sovereign nation, and the two nations shared very close diplomatic, economic, and military ties until the 1990s.

The United States had a long history of intervening in Liberia's internal affairs, occasionally sending naval vessels to help the Americo-Liberians, who comprised the ruling minority, put down insurrections by indigenous tribes (in 1821, 1843, 1876, 1910, and 1915). By 1909, Liberia faced serious external threats to its sovereignty from the European colonial powers over unpaid foreign loans and annexation of its borderlands.

President William Howard Taft devoted a portion of his First Annual Message to Congress (December 7, 1909) to the Liberian question, noting the close historical ties between the two countries that gave an opening for a wider intervention:

"It will be remembered that the interest of the United States in the Republic of Liberia springs from the historical fact of the foundation of the Republic by the colonization of American citizens of the African race. In an early treaty with Liberia there is a provision under which the United States may be called upon for advice or assistance. Pursuant to this provision and in the spirit of the moral relationship of the United States to Liberia, that Republic last year asked this Government to lend assistance in the solution of certain of their national problems, and hence the Commission was sent across the ocean on two cruisers.

In 1912 the U.S. arranged a 40-year international loan of $1.7 million, against which Liberia had to agree to four Western powers (America, Britain, France and Germany) controlling Liberian Government revenues for the next 14 years, until 1926. American administration of the border police also stabilized the frontier with Sierra Leone and checked French ambitions to annex more Liberian territory. The American navy also established a coaling station in Liberia, cementing its presence. When World War I started, Liberia declared war on Germany and expelled its resident German merchants, who constituted the country's largest investors and trading partners – Liberia suffered economically as a result.

In the largest American private investment in Africa, in 1926, the Liberian government gave a concession to the American rubber company Firestone to start the world's largest rubber plantation at Harbel, Liberia. At the same time, Firestone arranged a $5 million private loan to Liberia.

In the 1930s Liberia was again virtually bankrupt, and, after some American pressure, agreed to an assistance plan from the League of Nations.  As part of this plan, two key officials of the League were placed in positions to ´advise´ the Liberian government.

Ethiopia

U.S.-Ethiopian relations were established in 1903, after meetings in Ethiopia between Emperor Menelik II and an emissary of President Theodore Roosevelt. This first step was augmented with treaties of arbitration and conciliation signed at Addis Ababa 26 January 1929. These formal relations included a grant of Most Favored Nation status, and were good up to the Italian occupation in 1935.

Italy invaded and conquered Ethiopia 1935, and evaded League of Nations sanctions. The United States was one of only five countries which refused to recognize the Italian conquest. During World War II, British forces expel the Italians and restored independence to Ethiopia.  In January 1944, when President Franklin Roosevelt met personally with Emperor Haile Selassie in  Egypt. The meeting both strengthened the Emperor's already strong predilection towards the United States, as well as discomforted the British who had been at odds with the Ethiopian government over the disposition of Eritrea and the Ogaden. 

In the 1950s, Ethiopia became a minor player in the Cold War after signing a series of treaties with the United States, and receiving  $282 million in military assistance and $366 million in economic assistance in agriculture, education, public health, and transportation.  In 1957, Vice President Richard Nixon visited Ethiopia and called it "one of the United States' most stalwart and consistent allies".

The economic aid came through Washington's "Point Four" program and served as a model for American assistance to the newly independent African nations.  The original goal of "Point Four" was containing the spread of communism, which was not a major threat in Africa in the 1950s. More broadly it served as a political project to convince Africans that it was to their long-term interest to side with the West. The program  sought to improve social and economic conditions without interfering with existing political or social order.

Morocco

Relations between Morocco the United States date back to the 18th century. On December 20, 1777, the Kingdom of Morocco became the first country in the world to recognize United States independence, only a year and a half after the U.S. Declaration of Independence was issued.

Egypt

Trade and cultural relations date back to the late 19th century. the Presbyterians and other  Protestant organizations sponsored large-scale missionary activity.  Small numbers of Egyptians converted to Christianity. Influential circles in the United States gained an increased awareness of the social and economic conditions in Egypt. One major impact was bringing modern educational methods to Egypt, which the local officials and British had largely ignored. The flagship institution was the American University in Cairo, which offered all classes in Arabic, and practiced flexible methods that were adopted in Egyptian-sponsored schools when they began to appear in the 20th century.

Official Modern relations were established in 1922 when the United States recognized Egypt's independence from a protectorate status of the United Kingdom. Britain nevertheless controlled Egyptian foreign affairs, and the United States rarely had direct connections with the Egyptian government. In 1956, the U.S. was alarmed at the closer ties between Egypt and the Soviet Union, and prepared the OMEGA Memorandum as a stick to reduce the regional power of President Gamal Abdel Nasser.

When Egypt recognized Communist China, the U.S. ended talks about funding the Aswan Dam, a high prestige project much desired by Egypt. The dam was later built by the Soviet Union. When Nasser nationalized the Suez Canal in 1956, the Suez Crisis erupted with Britain and France invading to retake control of the canal. Using heavy diplomatic and economic pressure, the Eisenhower administration forced Britain and France to withdraw soon. A major result was that the United States largely replaced Great Britain in terms of regional influence in the Middle East.

Others

Kingdom of Dahomey

In 1860, the Clotilda arrived in the Kingdom of Dahomey to illegally transport 110 slaves to the United States after the U.S. abolished the Atlantic slave trade in 1808 with the Act Prohibiting Importation of Slaves, the last known slave ship to have carried slaves from Africa to the United States. 

Writing in his journal in 1860, Captain William Foster of the Clotilda described how he came in possession of the enslaved Africans on his ship,

Togo
In 1901, the Tuskegee Institute, a state college in Alabama directed by the national Black leader Booker T. Washington, sent experts to the German colony of Togo in West Africa. The goal was to introduce modern agricultural technology in order to modernize the colony, basing its economy on cotton exports.

World War II
Vichy France controlled much of North Africa. with the British based in Egypt pushing back German and Italian forces, the United States and Britain launched Operation Torch with amphibious landings in Morocco  and Algeria in November 1942. After brief resistance, the Vichy French forces switch sides and began to collaborate with the Allies. After some delays, the eastern and western Allied forces met up in Tunisia, and forced the surrender the main German and Italian armies. The Americans then moved on to an invasion of Sicily and in southern Italy.

Numerous locations in Africa were used in moving supplies that were either flown in via Brazil or brought in by ship. supplies were transshipped across Africa and moved through Egypt to supply the Soviet Union.

Decolonization, 1951 to 1960
All the colonial powers engaged in decolonization in the 1950s, starting with Libya 1951, Sudan, Morocco and Tunisia in 1956, and Ghana in 1957. In 1958 President Eisenhower's State Department created the Bureau of African Affairs under the Assistant Secretary of State for African Affairs to deal with sub- Sahara Africa. Countries in North Africa were under the Bureau of Near Eastern Affairs. G. Mennen Williams, a former Democratic governor of Michigan, was the assistant secretary of state under President John F. Kennedy.  

Williams actively promoted and encouraged decolonization. The Kennedy administration launched the Peace Corps, which sent thousands of young American volunteers to serve in local villages. The United States Agency for International Development (USAID) started providing cash economic assistance, and the Pentagon provided funds and munitions for local armies. Euphoria ended when the Congo Crisis of the 1960s indicated very large scale instability.

Kennedy-Johnson, 1961-1969
Whereas Eisenhower had largely neglected Africa, President John F. Kennedy took an aggressive activist approach. Kennedy was alarmed by the implications of Soviet leader Nikita Khrushchev's 1961 speech that proclaimed the USSR's intention to intervene in anticolonial struggles around the world. Since most nations in Europe, Latin America, and Asia had already chosen sides, Kennedy and Krushchev both looked to Africa as the next Cold War battleground. Under the leadership of Sékou Touré, the former French colony of Guinea in West Africa proclaimed its independence in 1958 and immediately sought foreign aid.

Eisenhower was hostile to Touré, so the African nation quickly turned to the Soviet Union--making it the Kremlin's first success story in Africa. Kennedy and his Peace Corps director Sargent Shriver tried even harder than Khrushchev. By 1963 Guinea had shifted away from Moscow into a closer friendship with Washington.  Kennedy had a broad vision that encompassed all of Africa. He opened up the White House to receive eleven African heads of state in 1961, ten in 1962, and another seven in 1963.

Jimmy Carter: 1977-81

Historians are generally agreed that President Jimmy Carter, 1977–81, was not very successful when it came to Africa. However, there are multiple explanations available.  The orthodox interpretation posits Carter as a dreamy star-eyed idealist. Revisionists said that did not matter nearly as much as the intense rivalry between dovish Secretary of State Cyrus Vance and hawkish National Security Adviser Zbigniew Brzezinski. Vance lost nearly all the battles, and finally resigned in disgust.  

Meanwhile, there are now post-revisionist historians who blame his failures on his confused management style and his refusal to make tough decisions. Along post-revisionist lines, Nancy Mitchell in a monumental book depicts Carter as a decisive but ineffective Cold Warrior, who, nevertheless had some successes because Soviet incompetence was even worse.

Reagan-Bush administrations, 1981-1993

The Presidency of Ronald Reagan, starting in January 1981, decided that the Carter administration had largely failed in Africa, and sharply changed directions. It abandoned the Carter emphasis on human rights, and instead emphasized anti-communism. This meant reversals of policies in South Africa and Angola, and changes in the USA's relationships with Ethiopia and Libya, which were pro-Soviet.

Carter's policy was to denounce and try to end the apartheid policies in South Africa and Angola,  whereby small white minorities had full control of government. Under the new conservative administration a more conciliatory approach was taken by the Assistant Secretary of State Chester Crocker.  He rejected confrontational approaches, and called for "Constructive engagement". Crocker was highly critical of the outgoing Carter administration for its apparent hostility to the white minority government in South Africa, by acquiescing in the United Nations Security Council's imposition of a mandatory arms embargo (UNSCR 418/77) and the UN's demand for the end of South Africa's illegal occupation of Namibia (UNSCR 435/78).

Crocker came up with a complex multinational peace plan, that he struggled to achieve for eight years. The most essential provision required the removal of Cuba's large, well-armed forces from Angola.  The United States would then quit funding the anti-Marxist forces led by Jonas Savimbi, South Africa would pull out of Southwest Africa, allowing Namibia to become independent. The white rulers in South Africa would remain in power but relax their restrictions on the African National Congress. Crocker was successful in 1988, and during the George HW Bush administration, 1989 to 1993, the goals were realized.

The Reagan administration mobilized private philanthropic and business sources to fund food supplies to areas in Africa devastated by famine. For example, music promoter Bob Geldorf in 1985 produced Live Aid, a benefit concert that raised over $65 million and dramatically raised awareness. US government focused on transportation and administrative issues.

Recent history

Military 

As of 2019 the U.S. military maintains a network of 29 military bases across the African continent.

Diplomatic missions 

 The African Union maintains a delegation with a resident Ambassador to Washington, D.C.

See also 
 Africa–China relations
 Africa–Soviet Union relations
 Africa–EU relations
 France–Africa relations
 Africa–India relations
 Africa–Japan relations
 Africa–North Korea relations
 Africa-South Korea relations
 France–Africa relations
 African immigration to the United States
 United States Africa Command
 List of United States military bases
 Visa policy of the United States

Notes

Further reading

 Abramovici, Pierre, and Julie Stoker. "United States: the new scramble for Africa." Review of African Political Economy (2004): 685-690 online.
 Banks, John P., et al. "Top five reasons why Africa should be a priority for the United States." (Brookings, 2013) online.
 Butler, L. J. "Britain, the United States, and the demise of the Central African Federation, 1959–63." Journal of Imperial and Commonwealth History 28.3 (2000): 131–151.
 Chester, Edward W. Clash of Titans: Africa and US Foreign Policy (Orbis Books, 1974) online review
 Damis, John. "The United States and North Africa." in Polity And Society In Contemporary North Africa (Routledge, 2019). 221–240.
 Devermont, Judd. "World is Coming to Sub-Saharan Africa. Where is the United States?" (Center for Strategic and International Studies (CSIS), 2018) online.
 Duignan, P., and L. H. Gann. The United States and Africa: A History (Cambridge University Press, 1984) online
 Gordon, David F. et al. eds. The United States and Africa : a post-Cold War perspective (1998) online
 Kraxberger, Brennan M. "The United States and Africa: shifting geopolitics in an" Age of Terror"." Africa Today (2005): 47-68 online.
 Rosenberg, Emily S. "The Invisible Protectorate: The United States, Liberia, and the Evolution of Neocolonialism, 1909–40." Diplomatic History (1985) 9#3 pp 191–214.
 Schraeder, Peter J. United States foreign policy toward Africa: Incrementalism, crisis and change (Cambridge UP, 1994).
 Shinn, David H. "Africa: the United States and China court the continent." Journal of International Affairs 62.2 (2009): 37-53 online.
 Yohannes, Okbazghi. The United States and the Horn of Africa: an analytical study of pattern and process (Routledge, 2019).
 Zimmerman, Andrew. Alabama in Africa: Booker T. Washington, the German empire, and the globalization of the New South (Princeton UP, 2010).

 
United States
Foreign relations of the United States